The GRES-2 Power Station (or Power Station Ekibastuz) is a coal-fueled power generating station in Ekibastuz, Kazakhstan. The reinforced concrete chimney is about  taller than the Inco Superstack in Sudbury, Ontario, Canada. It is the tallest chimney ever built.

The power station is the start of the Powerline Ekibastuz–Kokshetau and uses a transmission voltage of 1,150 kVAC, the highest transmission voltage in the world. The extension of this line to Chelyabinsk in Russia is also designed for 1,150 kV, but it currently operates at only 500 kV. About 3/4 of the energy produced by GRES-2 was exported to Russia.

Fifty percent of GRES-2 shares are owned by Inter RAO UES, and fifty percent by Kazakhstan's government.

Individual units
The planned capacity of 4,000 MWe is to be provided by eight equal units, 500 MWe each. 
 Unit 1 was launched into service in December 1990. 
 Unit 2 was launched into service in December 1993.
 Construction of Unit 3 was started in 1990 but later stopped.

See also

 Ekibastuz GRES-1
 List of chimneys
 List of towers
 List of tallest freestanding structures in the world
 Unfinished building
 List of tallest buildings and structures in the world

External links
 Smoke-stack diagrams
 GRES-2 official website
 

Energy infrastructure completed in 1987
Towers completed in 1987
Power stations built in the Soviet Union
Chimneys in Kazakhstan
Coal-fired power stations in Kazakhstan
Electric power companies of Kazakhstan
Inter RAO
1987 establishments in the Soviet Union